Tharle Nan Maga (English: Naughty fellow)  is a 1992 Indian Kannada-language comedy drama film written and directed by Upendra in his directorial debut, which stars Jaggesh and Anjali Sudhakar in lead roles, who also made their debuts in lead roles with the film.

Plot
The story revolves around a miserly couple Parandamaiah Urbagal (Bank Janardhan) and Subbalakshmi (Satyabhama), who want their son Santhosh Urbagal (Jaggesh) to marry a rich girl, for want of dowry. Santhosh, however, marries a girl from a poor financial background, antagonizing them. How son changes his parents outlook forms rest of the story.

Parandamaiah owns a general store, 'Oorubaglu General Stores'. Santhosh likes to keep the shop as he loves Sangeetha, the daughter of Shankar Shastry, a musician, whose house is opposite the shop. Santhosh spends his time sightseeing (the subject is mostly Sangeetha) and he is hostile towards customers when he is sightseeing (he calls it 'Dove Hodiyodu', one of his popular dialogues). His friends - 'Chitke' Seena, Raja, 'Razor' Manja, Nanja and 'nanjappan maga' Gunjappa. They help Santhosh to gain Sangeetha's affection. However, Parandamaiah and Satyabhama decide to marry Santhosh to his uncle's daughter Sundari for dowry. However, Santhosh disagrees to marry any girl for dowry as he wants his wife to be the love of his life. Santhosh succeeds in marrying Sangeetha by hoodwinking his parents. Later, with the help of his friends, he starts to enjoy his married life. But, Parandamaiah and Satyabhama decide to cheat Santhosh and create a feud between Santhosh and Sangeetha. They make Sangeetha assume that Santhosh is having a sexual relationship with Sundari. Meanwhile, they make Santhosh assume Sangeetha is having an extramarital affair. Santhosh investigates this and he assumes that Sangeetha is having an affair (the assumed boyfriend was paid by Parandamaiah). Due to this, Sangeetha goes back to her maternal home. Soon Santhosh finds out about this, and, with the help of his friends, makes his parents realize that good values are more important than money. Later, after he makes his parents realise their mistake, his uncle finds that Sundari is pregnant. He allegedly accuses Santhosh of impregnating Sundari. However, this is not the case as he had told his friends to loaf and flirt with Sundari to enlighten his parents. Later, Santhosh arranges for the marriage of Sundari. In the climax, Santhosh finds that Gunjappa had impregnated Sundari and he is forced to marry Sundari.
Thus the movie ends on a happy note.

Cast
 Jaggesh as Santosh Urbagal, Parandamaiah and Subbalakshmi Son
 Nithya as Sangeetha, Santhosh's Wife
 Bank Janardhan as Parandamaiah Urbagal
 Satyabhama as Subbalakshmi, Parandamaiah's Wife
 Anjali Sudhakar as Sundri
Mysore Lokesh as Santosh's Maternal Uncle and Sundri Father.
 Tennis Krishna as Krishna
 M. S. Umesh as Purohit
 Vijanath biradar as beggar
Honnavalli Krishna as Chitke Seena
L. S. Sudhindra as Sangeetha's father
Upendra (actor) as Special appearance & voice over
Sriraj Kothari 
Madhugiri Prakash

Production
Upendra, former assistant of Kashinath made his directorial debut with this film. The film also introduced Jaggesh as a Hero and V. Manohar as a composer both went on to become popular.

Soundtrack
All the songs are composed, scored by V. Manohar and lyrics written by Upendra.

 "Sangeetha Kalisikodi" - L. N. Shastry, Chandrika Gururaj, Upendra , V. Manohar
 "Ninna Ninna Jadsi Odithini" - Jaggesh, Manjula Gururaj
 "Hingyaake Nee Kaduthi" - Chandrika Gururaj
 "Dagar Dagar" - L. N. Shastry, Latha Hamsalekha, Upendra

References

External links

Films set in Bangalore
1990s Kannada-language films
1992 films
1990s sex comedy films
Films directed by Upendra
Films scored by V. Manohar
Indian sex comedy films
1992 directorial debut films
1992 comedy films